is a Japanese actor born in Kyoto. A  multi-award winning thespian, he won best actor at the 30th Yokohama Film Festival and best-supporting actor at the 8th Yokohama Film Festival for Sorobanzuku.

Career
Kobayashi starred in Yoichi Sai's Quill. He also appeared in Yuya Ishii's The Great Passage and starred as "Master" in both the films, Midnight Diner and Midnight Diner 2. He is most widely recognized by Western audiences for his lead performance in the episodic counterpart drama series, Midnight Diner: Tokyo Stories, which was later picked up for international streaming by Netflix. The show garnered critical-acclaim and holds a perfect 100% score on review aggregator Rotten Tomatoes.

Filmography

Film

Television

Dubbing
The West Wing (seasons 1-4), Josiah Bartlet (Martin Sheen)

Awards

References

External links
 Official profile 
 

1951 births
Living people
Male actors from Kyoto
Japanese racehorse owners and breeders